Franklim Balde Capristano Furtado (born October 21, 1987) is a Bissau-Guinean professional basketball player, currently with Academia do Lumiar Lisboa of the Proliga (Portugal).

He represented Guinea-Bissau's national basketball team at the FIBA Africa Championship 2011 qualification.

References

External links
 Profile at league website 
 Eurobasket.com profile 
 REAL GM profile

Videos
 Franklim Furtado - 2012/13 Season Highlights - Youtube.com video

1987 births
Living people
Power forwards (basketball)
Bissau-Guinean men's basketball players
Sportspeople from Bissau